Quercus dumosa is a species of plant in the family Fagaceae, belonging to the white oak section of the oak genus (Quercus). This tree goes by the common names coastal sage scrub oak and Nuttall's scrub oak.

Description
Quercus dumosa is an evergreen shrub growing 1 to 3 metres (40–120 inches or 3–10 feet) tall from a large, deep root network. The leaves have spiny or toothed edges. Some individuals produce large crops of acorns, and some produce very few fruits. The acorns are dispersed by gravity as they fall from the tree, and by animals that pick them up, such as squirrels and jays. Animals eat them immediately or cache them for later. The acorns tend to germinate easily. Reproduction via seed generally occurs only in very moist years.

Taxonomy 
The name Quercus dumosa was formerly widely applied to nearly all the scrub oaks of the white oak group of California and Baja California. The concept of this species has gradually narrowed as phylogenetic research and taxonomic treatments have segregated out several species. Oaks previously placed under Q. dumosa include:

 Q. turbinella
 Q. john-tuckeri
 Q. cornelius-mulleri
 Q. berberidifolia
 Q. pacifica

However, the majority of oaks referred to as Quercus dumosa in the past are now regarded as Quercus berberidifolia. The current concept of Q. dumosa is limited to the populations of scraggly shrub oaks with short petioles, cordate leaf bases, erect curly trichomes on the abaxial leaf surface, and narrow, acute acorns which almost always occur at low elevations and very often within sight of the ocean.

Distribution and habitat
Quercus dumosa is found in California and Baja California. In Baja California, it is found from the Mexico–United States border south to the Colonet peninsula. It is threatened by habitat loss. The species lends its name to the plant community called the "Quercus dumosa chaparral", in which Coastal sage scrub oak and toyon often co-dominate in chaparral.

Ecology

Quercus dumosa grows primarily in sandy soils such as sandstone near the coast. Its habitat is often chaparral. This oak sprouts vigorously from its stump and root crown after wildfire and develops a large canopy within a few years after a fire event. It sometimes co-dominates with Ceanothus species as early as four years after a fire. This oak also does well in the absence of fire.

Allergenicity
The species is a severe allergen, with pollination generally occurring in spring.

See also
 California chaparral and woodlands

References

External links

 
 

dumosa
Flora of California
Flora of Baja California
Natural history of the California chaparral and woodlands
Natural history of the Peninsular Ranges
Plants described in 1842
Taxa named by Thomas Nuttall
Endangered biota of Mexico
Endangered flora of North America
Species endangered by habitat loss
Taxonomy articles created by Polbot
Oaks of Mexico